Frank Vallis (5 May 1896 — September 1957) was an English footballer who played as a goalkeeper.

Career
Frank Vallis played for Horfield United in the Bristol & Suburban League before signing for Bristol City in April 1919. He was later joined at Bristol City by his brothers Jack Vallis & Arthur Vallis. In May 1926 along with Charlie Sutherland he joined Merthyr Town. Vallis made his debut in a 0–3 defeat at Exeter City on 28 August 1926. Two days later Vallis suffered a broken leg playing in a 3–2 win over Bristol Rovers at Penydarren Park, this unfortunate incident led to the 35yr old player manager Albert Lindon making 33 appearances in goal in 1926–27.  After retiring Frank Vallis coached football and cricket at Monkton Combe School in Bath where he was known and remembered with affection as "Pro Vallis". He served as chairman of Monkton Combe parish council.

Honours
with Bristol City
Football League Third Division South winner: 1922–23
FA Cup semi-finalist 1920

References

1896 births
1957 deaths
Footballers from Bristol
English footballers
Association football goalkeepers
English Football League players
Southern Football League players
Merthyr Town F.C. players
Yeovil Town F.C. players
Bristol City F.C. players
Staff at Monkton Combe School